Stenocereus montanus, known as sahuira, is a species of columnar cactus in the family Cactaceae. It is endemic to Mexico where it is found from Sonora to Colima.

The species grows up to 7 meters high with a smooth trunk. The flowers are pollinated by bats. Fruits may be orange, red, or white, and are consumed by birds and bats. Their flavor is highly regarded.

References

montanus
Flora of Mexico
Plants described in 1961